Catalunya en Comú (CatEnComú or CatComú), previously Un País en Comú and collectively dubbed as Comuns, is a Catalan-based political party established in December 2016 as an umbrella for Barcelona en Comú, Initiative for Catalonia Greens (ICV), United and Alternative Left (EUiA), Podemos and Equo, which until then had been collaborating through electoral alliances under the Catalunya Sí que es Pot and En Comú Podem labels in the September 2015 regional and December 2015 and June 2016 general elections.

Its spokesman until 2018 was En Comú Podem's spokesperson in the Congress of Deputies, Xavier Domènech, with the new party being sponsored by Mayor of Barcelona Ada Colau. It contested the 2017 Catalan regional election under the Catalunya en Comú–Podem label, in coalition with Podemos, then joined the En Comú Podem alliance ahead of the April and November 2019 Spanish general elections.

History
The first stepts for constituting the political space previously represented by the Catalunya Sí que es Pot and En Comú Podem alliances into a permanent political party can be traced to January 2016, when the party's trademark was provisionally registered in the interior ministry and Mayor of Barcelona Ada Colau announced her intention of establishing her own, autonomous party separate from Podemos. On 19 December 2016, the "Un País en Comú" platform was launched with the aim of constituting the political space previously represented by the Catalunya Sí que es Pot and En Comú Podem alliances into a permanent political party.

The platform's establishment had been supported by Initiative for Catalonia Greens (ICV), United and Alternative Left (EUiA), Barcelona en Comú and Equo, with it holding its first public event on 29 January 2017 in Barcelona, and the party's founding congress on 8 April. Organizational disagreements in March over the voting system selected to elect the leadership team and the ideological principles that should govern the new platform had seen regional Podemos/Podem leader, Albano Dante Fachin, opting out of the founding congress at the last moment, promising future collaboration with the other constituent parties but rejecting to integrate Podem into the new party. Despite this, several Podem members disaffected with Fachin's leadership, such as Jéssica Albiach o Marc Bertomeu, did join the new party on their own accord.

The definitive name of the party was to be chosen in a voting among party members following the founding assembly, with several proposals being registered in advance to prevent a similar case as what happened to the "Guanyem" trademark in 2014: Catalunya en Comú (Catalan for "Catalonia in Common"), En Comú Podem ("In Common We Can"), En Comú ("In Common") or Comuns ("Commons"). In a final voting held on 22 May 2017, name "Catalunya en Comú" was picked by party members over "En Comú Podem" in a 54–46% vote.

Composition

Electoral performance

Parliament of Catalonia

Cortes Generales

Symbols

Notes

References

External links

 
2016 establishments in Catalonia
Political parties established in 2016
Political parties in Catalonia